Ryan Shanley (born 16 January 2001) is a Scottish professional footballer who plays as a striker for Edinburgh City.

Club career

Hibernian
Shanley joined Hibernian at under-15 level and progressed through the youth ranks. In January 2020 he signed a two-year contract with the club. He previously spent time on loan with Civil Service Strollers and Forfar Athletic. He made one appearance for Forfar, in a 6–0 defeat at Falkirk on 25 January 2020.

In September 2020, he made his professional debut as a late substitute in a 3–0 win at St Mirren. Shanley moved on loan to Kelty Hearts in December 2020. Shanley returned to Hibs in January 2021 due to the suspension of football in the Scottish lower leagues. Shanley was then loaned to Irish  club Finn Harps, ahead of the 2021 season starting in March. He made his debut in the opening game of the season as his side won 1–0 at home to Bohemians on 20 March 2021. Shanley's loan spell was cut short on 10 May 2021  after making just 1 start for the club and failing to score in 8 appearances.

Shanley moved on loan to Edinburgh City in June 2021 on a deal due to run for the whole of the 2021–22 season. This loan arrangement was cut short when Shanley was released by Hibs in August 2021.

Edinburgh City
Following his release by Hibs, Shanley signed for Edinburgh City on 2 September 2021.

Career statistics

Personal life
Shanley is the cousin of former Hibernian and Scotland striker Derek Riordan.

References

2001 births
Living people
Place of birth missing (living people)
Scottish footballers
Association football forwards
Hibernian F.C. players
Forfar Athletic F.C. players
Scottish Professional Football League players
Kelty Hearts F.C. players
Finn Harps F.C. players
F.C. Edinburgh players
Civil Service Strollers F.C players